Forest Hall School is a coeducational secondary school located in Stansted Mountfitchet, Essex, England.

In 2016 64% of students gained at least 5 GCSEs at A*-C including Maths and English. This figure had increased since 2013, when 28% of students achieved at least 5 GCSE grades A*-C including English and Maths. 67% of students also achieved A*-C grades on both English and Mathematics.

The school was originally called Mountfitchet High School before being renamed Mountfitchet Maths and Computing College. The school was re-branded as Forest Hall School in September 2013, named after the road it is situated. The school converted to academy status in February 2015 and is now sponsored by BMAT.

References

External links
Official website

Secondary schools in Essex
Academies in Essex
Stansted Mountfitchet